Pollenia calamisessa is a species of cluster fly in the family Polleniidae.

Distribution
Australia.

References

Polleniidae
Insects described in 1932
Diptera of Australasia